John Paul Hanlon (1913-1968) was an Irish Roman Catholic priest and painter.
Jack Hanlon was born in Templeogue, Dublin on 6 May 1913. He educated at Belvedere College and went on to study for the priesthood in 1932 at Clonliffe College while also studying at UCD, and studied painting in Belgium, Spain and he won a scholarship to study in Paris under André Lhote.
He completed his clerical training at Maynooth and was ordained priest at St. Patrick’s College, Maynooth in 1939.

Hanlon won the Douglas Hyde prize and the Arts Council prize for a painting of a historical subject. Predominantly a watercolourist, he did produce some Oil on canvas painting. During war years he also designed Christmas Cards for Victor Waddington, he had also exhibited in Waddingtons gallery in Dublin prior to its closure. His work was also part of the painting event in the art competition at the 1948 Summer Olympics.

He was a founding member of Irish Exhibition of Living Art. He served as curate in Churchtown, Dublin, until his death aged 55 on 12 August 1968. Fr. Hanlon is buried, alongside his parents James and Kathleen, in Templeogue Cemetery, County Dublin.

Many of his works are on public display, in churches and in art galleries, Stations Of The Cross and Recreation  (Oil on canvas) in the Crawford Art Gallery, Cork, and Firey Leaves in the Highlanes Gallery, Drogheda.

In 2013 five watercolours by Fr. Hanlon, were stolen from Our Lady of the Rosary Church, Limerick.

References

1913 births
1968 deaths
20th-century Irish painters
Irish male painters
Christian clergy from Dublin (city)
Irish watercolourists
20th-century Irish Roman Catholic priests
People educated at Belvedere College
Alumni of St Patrick's College, Maynooth
Alumni of Clonliffe College
Olympic competitors in art competitions
20th-century Irish male artists